The Student Armed Force (abbreviated SAF) is an armed resistance organization in Myanmar.

History 
In response to the  2021 Myanmar coup d'état, members of Yangon-based  learned basic military training in the liberated area of ​​the Arakan Army, and with the support of the Arakan Army formed the Student Armed Force on April 27, 2021, with 22 leaders.

On 24 January 2022, the Student Armed Force reported that 9 of its fighters had been killed in an attack on a 60-strong army column of Tamadaw. Former actress Honey Nway Oo is currently serving as a senior officer in the force.

References

2021 establishments in Myanmar
Military units and formations established in 2021
Paramilitary organisations based in Myanmar
Rebel groups in Myanmar